Mohabat Khan Marri  is a Pakistani Politician and a former Member of Senate of Pakistan.

Political career
He belongs to Baluchistan province, and was elected to the Senate of Pakistan on general seat as Pakistan Muslim League (PML) candidate. His tenure began in March 2006, and ended in March 2012. As a Senator he has served in Standing Committee on Petroleum and Natural Resources, Standing Committee on Food, Agriculture and Livestock and as a Chairman of Standing Committee on Local Government and Rural Development. He was a Provincial Minister for Revenue, Religious, Excise and Minorities Affairs during 1999-2002 Balochistan Assembly Cabinet.

See also
 List of Senators of Pakistan
 Kalsoom Perveen
 Abdul Rahim Khan Mandokhel

References

Politicians from Balochistan, Pakistan
Living people
Year of birth missing (living people)